Monmouth Heights, New Jersey may refer to:

Monmouth Heights, Manalapan, New Jersey
Monmouth Heights, Marlboro, New Jersey